("Month of new plants" or "March") was one of 32  destroyers built for the Imperial Japanese Navy (IJN) in the first decade of the 20th century.

Design and description
The Kamikaze-class destroyers were improved versions of the preceding . The Kamikazes were powered by two vertical triple-expansion steam engines, each driving one shaft using steam produced by four Kampon water-tube boilers. Their crew consisted of 70 officers and ratings.

The main armament of the Kamikaze-class ships consisted of two 40-calibre quick-firing (QF)  12 cwt guns on single mounts; the forward gun was located on superstructure, but the aft gun was at the stern. Four 28-calibre QF three-inch 8 cwt guns on single mounts were positioned abreast the superstructure, two in each broadside. The ships were also armed with two single rotating mounts for  torpedoes between the superstructure and the stern gun.

Construction and career 
Yayoi was launched at Yokosuka Naval Arsenal on 7 August 1905 and completed on 23 August 1905. The ship saw service in World War I and decommissioned on 1 December 1924, although she remained in use as an auxiliary until 16 June 1926. She was sunk as a target by aircraft on 10 August off the Oki Islands.

Notes

Citations

Books

 

Kamikaze-class destroyers (1905)
1905 ships
World War I destroyers of Japan
Ships built by Yokosuka Naval Arsenal